Kharkov, the Russian name for Kharkiv, is a city in Ukraine.

Kharkov may also refer to:

Battles
First Battle of Kharkov (1941), a German offensive in World War II
Second Battle of Kharkov (1942), a German counteroffensive in World War II
Third Battle of Kharkov (1943), a German offensive in World War II
Operation Polkovodets Rumyantsev, also known as Fourth Battle of Kharkov, 1943

People
Catherine Karkov, medieval academic
Sergey Kharkov (born 1970), a Soviet and Russian gymnast

Other uses
Kharkov: The Soviet Spring Offensive, a 1978 board wargame simulating the Second Battle of Kharkov
Air Kharkov, a defunct Ukrainian airline
Kharkov Governorate, a governorate of the Russian Empire
The former name of Norshen, Shirak, Armenia

See also

 
 
Kharkiv (disambiguation), uses of Kharkiv which in some cases may be substituted for Kharkov
Kharkiv Operation (disambiguation)
Battle of Kharkiv (disambiguation)
Battle of Kharkov, various World War II battles